Sean Griffiths (born 16 May 1995) is a Welsh first-class cricketer. He is a right-handed batsman and a right-arm medium fast bowler. He made his first-class debut Cardiff MCCU against Glamorgan on 1 April 2014.

References

External links

1995 births
Living people
Welsh cricketers
Cardiff MCCU cricketers
Wales National County cricketers